Wit's End Publishing is a small publishing house established in 2003 by JT Lindroos and Kathleen Martin. It has published two titles by Charles Willeford: The Second Half of the Double Feature, a collection of Willeford's short fiction and poetry, and a reprint of The Black Mass of Brother Springer which featured an introduction by James Sallis and included a previously unpublished play based on the novel.

External links
 Wit's End Publishing Official Web Site
 Article from LEO Weekly

Book publishing companies of the United States
Small press publishing companies
Publishing companies established in 2003